Elton Joe Kendall (born 1954) is a former United States district judge of the United States District Court for the Northern District of Texas.

Education and career

Born in Dallas, Texas, Kendall was a police officer in the Dallas Police Department from 1972 to 1978. He received a Bachelor of Business Administration from Southern Methodist University in 1977 and a Juris Doctor from Baylor University School of Law in 1980. He was an assistant district attorney of Dallas County, Texas from 1980 to 1982, thereafter entering private practice in Dallas until 1986.

Judicial career 

Kendall was a judge on the 195th Texas State District Court from 1987 to 1992.

On March 20, 1992, Kendall was nominated by President George H. W. Bush to a new seat on the United States District Court for the Northern District of Texas created by 104 Stat. 5089. He was confirmed by the United States Senate on May 12, 1992, and received his commission on May 15, 1992. In 1999, he was also appointed by President Bill Clinton to be a Commissioner of the United States Sentencing Commission. Kendall resigned from the bench, on January 22, 2002, and from the U.S. Sentencing Commission in 2003.

Other service

During Kendall's public service, he was editor of In Camera, the national newsletter of the Federal Judges Association, where he was also a member of the Board of Directors. As a member of the U.S. Sentencing Commission, Kendall worked on many important sentencing issues including guidelines dealing with white collar fraud cases, penalties in drug and immigration cases, internet fraud and pornography guidelines, as well as corporate governance and compliance issues under the Sarbanes-Oxley Act of 2002.

Kendall taught in numerous programs presented by the Federal Judicial Center (the entity that teaches federal judges) in Washington, D.C. beginning in the mid-1990s. He has taught the Federal Sentencing Guidelines to new federal judges at Federal Judicial Center orientation programs and docket management to experienced federal judges from around the country. Kendall has also taught conference workshops for the federal judges of Texas, Louisiana and Mississippi, federal trial and appellate prosecutors from throughout the country at their training center in South Carolina, lawyers of the Federal Bar Association and United States Probation Officers nationwide. Kendall has also been a faculty member of the Texas Center for the Judiciary, the educational entity that teaches Texas State Judges.

Post-judicial career 

Following his resignation from the bench, Kendall managed the Dallas office of Provost Umphrey. The law firm gained national recognition for its lead against tobacco companies for the State of Texas, producing a $17.3 billion settlement. As of 2017, Kendall is managing partner of Kendall Law Group, LLP. His practice focuses on complex civil and criminal litigation.

References

Sources
 

1954 births
Living people
Judges of the United States District Court for the Northern District of Texas
Southern Methodist University alumni
Texas state court judges
United States district court judges appointed by George H. W. Bush
20th-century American judges
Members of the United States Sentencing Commission
Baylor Law School alumni